Rosie may refer to:

Geography
 Rosie, Arkansas, an unincorporated community
 Rosie River,  Northern Territory, Australia

People and characters
 Rosie (given name)
 Rosie the Rocketeer (aka "Rosie"), a Boeing spaceflight test dummy
 Rosie the Riveter, a World War II character used to encourage women to work on the home front

Film
 Rosie (1965 film), an Indian Malayalam film starring Prem Nazir
 Rosie!, a 1967 film starring Rosalind Russell
 Rosie (1998 film), a Belgian film
 Rosie (2013 film), a Swiss film
 Rosie (2018 film), an Irish film
 Rosie (2022 film), a Canadian film

Television
 Rosie (TV series), a 1970s BBC TV police series
 Rosie Awards, the Alberta Film and Television Awards

Music

Groups
 Rosie and the Originals, an American 1960s musical group
 Rosie, a 1970s band of singer David Lasley

Albums
 Rosie (album), by Fairport Convention (1973)
 Rosie, an album by John Parish (2000)

Songs
 "Rosie", a single by Chubby Checker 1964
 "Rosie", a song by Jackson Browne from his 1977 album Running on Empty
 "Rosalita (Come Out Tonight)", song by Bruce Springsteen, often referred to as "Rosie"
 "Rosie", a song by Argent
 "Rosie", a song by Bill Morrissey
 "Rosie", a song by Claw Boys Claw
 "Rosie", a song by Daisy Dares You
 "Rosie", a song by Don Partridge
 "Rosie", title song of the 1973 album by Fairport Convention
 "Rosie", a single by Joan Armatrading from her 1979 EP How Cruel
 "Rosie", a song by The Kooks
 "Rosie", a song by The Mollys
 "Rosie", a song by Passenger
 "Rosie", a song by Richie Sambora
 "Rosie", a song by Tom Waits
 "Rosie", from the musical Bye Bye Birdie

Other uses
 Tropical Cyclone Rosie, tropical cyclones named Rosie
 Rosie the Riveter (disambiguation)
 Rosie the Elephant, an Asian elephant
 Rosie the Rocketer, scout attack aircraft
 Rosie, renamed version of McCall's magazine
 "Rosie", an internal project name for HTC Sense

See also

 Rose (disambiguation)
 Rosey (disambiguation)
 Rosy (disambiguation)
 
 Valea Roşie (disambiguation)